Dave Tolley (born 1978, Kitchener, Ontario) is a Canadian hand percussionist and drummer. He studied at York University in Toronto and Berklee College of Music in Boston. He is best known for his involvement with Canadian band Nine Mile. He often plays a cajon, as well as drumkit, and a variety of hand percussion. His playing is featured on all four Nine Mile albums, and he played on Xavier Rudd's Food in the Belly album. Tolley's drumming and percussion work can also be found on Rudd's June 2007 release, White Moth.

References

External links
Official Web Site

1978 births
Living people
Canadian rock drummers
Canadian male drummers
21st-century Canadian drummers
21st-century Canadian male musicians